The Yenish (German: Jenische; French: Yéniche) are an itinerant group in Western Europe who live mostly in Germany, Austria, Switzerland, Luxembourg, Belgium, and parts of France, roughly centred on the Rhineland. A number of theories for the group's origins have been proposed, including that the Yenish descended from  members of the marginalized and vagrant poor classes of society of the early modern period, before emerging as a distinct group by the early 19th century. Most of the Yenish became sedentary in the course of the mid-19th to 20th centuries.

Name
The Yenish people as a distinct group, as opposed to the generic class of vagrants of the early modern period, emerged towards the end of the 18th century. The adjective jenisch is first recorded in the early 18th century in the sense of "cant, argot". A self-designation Jauner is recorded in 1793. Jenisch remains strictly an adjective that refers to the language, not the people, until the first half of the 19th century. Jean Paul (1801) glosses jänische Sprache ("Yenish language") with so nennt man in Schwaben die aus fast allen Sprachen zusammengeschleppte Spitzbubensprache ("this is the term used in Swabia for an argot used by young rogues which has been conflated from all sorts of languages"). An anonymous author in 1810 argues that Jauner is a deprecating term, equivalent to "cardsharp", and that the proper designation for the people should be jenische Gasche.

Germany
Many Yenish people in Germany became sedentary in the second half of the 19th century. The Kingdom of Prussia in 1842 introduced a law forcing municipalities to provide social welfare to permanent residents without citizenship. As a consequence, there were attempts to prevent Yenish people from taking permanent residence. Recently established settlements of Yenish, Sinti, and Roma, dubbed "gypsy colonies" (Zigeunerkolonien), were discouraged and attempts were made to incite the settlers to move away, in the form of various forms of harassment, and in some cases physical attacks. By the late 19th century, many recently sedentary Yenish were nevertheless integrated into local populations, gradually moving away from their tradition of endogamy thus being absorbed into the general German population. Those Yenish who did not become sedentary by the late 19th century took to living in trailers.

The persecution of Romani people under Nazi Germany beginning in 1933 was directed not exclusively against the Romani people but also targeted "vagrants who travel around after the manner of the gypsies" (nach Zigeunerart umherziehende Landfahrer), which included the Yenish and people without permanent residence in general.  Travellers were scheduled for internment in  Buchenwald, Dachau, Sachsenhausen and Neuengamme. Yenish families began to be registered in  a Landfahrersippenarchiv ("archive of travelling families"), but this effort was incomplete by the end of World War II. It appears that only very limited numbers of Yenish (compared with the number of Romani victims) were actually deported: five Yenish individuals are on record as having  been deported from Cologne, and a total of 279 woonwagenbewoners ('caravan dwellers') are known to have been deported from the Netherlands in 1944. Lewy (2001) has discovered one case of the deportation of a Yenish woman in 1939. Another documented Yenish victim of the Nazi policies is Ernst Lossa (1929–1944), who was interned and euthanized for mental illness. The Yenish people are  mentioned as a persecuted group in the text of the 2012 Memorial to the Sinti and Roma Victims of National Socialism in Berlin.

Switzerland 
In 2001, Swiss National Councillor Remo Galli as speaker of the foundation "Zukunft für Schweizer Fahrende" reported an estimate of 35,000 "travellers" (Fahrende, a term combining Sinti, Roma and Yenish), both sedentary and non-sedentary, in Switzerland, among them an estimated 20,000 Yenish people.

From the 1920s until the 1970s, the Swiss government had a semi-official policy of institutionalizing Yenish parents and having their children adopted by members of the sedentary Swiss population. The name of this program was Kinder der Landstrasse ("Children of the Road"). What was ostensibly intended as a charitable effort to remove children from what was perceived as precarious conditions in a criminal milieu of homelessness and vagrancy was later criticized as a violation of the fundamental rights of the Yenishe to family life, with children separated from parents by force without due criminal procedure, and resulting in  many of the children suffering an ordeal of successive foster homes and orphanages. In all, 590 children were taken from their parents and institutionalized in orphanages, mental institutions, and even prisons. Child removals peaked in the 1930s to 1940s, in the years leading up to and during World War II. After public criticism in 1972, the program was discontinued in 1973.

An organisation for the political representation of travellers (Yenish as well as Sinti and Roma) was founded in 1975, named Radgenossenschaft der Landstrasse ("Wheel Cooperative of the Road"). The Swiss federal authorities have officially recognized the "Swiss Yenish and Sinti" as a "national minority". With the ratification of the European language charter in 1997, Switzerland has given the status of a "territorial non-tied language" to the Yenish language.

Yenish organisations 
 Radgenossenschaft der Landstrasse (Switzerland)
 Jenischer Kulturverband (Austria)
 Jenischer Bund in Deutschland und Europa (Germany)
 Woonwagenbelangen Nederland. (Netherlands)

Film and television 
 1957: Es geschah am hellichten Tag
 1979: Das gefrorene Herz
 1992: Kinder der Landstrasse
 2008: Hunkeler macht Sachen
 2016: Fog in August based on the 2008 book Fog in August
 2017: Dove cadono le ombre

Notable people 
 Mariella Mehr (1947–2022), notable for documenting the plight she suffered under the Kinder der Landstrasse project in the 1970s, contributing to its discontinuation
 Stephan Eicher (b. 1960), Swiss musician, Yenish on his father's side
 , Luxembourgish musician and variete performer
 Rafael van der Vaart (b. 1983), football player

References

External links